is a Japanese football player and manager.

Playing career
Shoji was born in Chiba Prefecture on September 14, 1971. After graduating from high school, he joined Japan Soccer League club Hitachi (later Kashiwa Reysol) based in his local in 1990. However he could hardly play in the match until 1994. In 1995, he moved to Japan Football League club NEC Yamagata (later Montedio Yamagata). He became a regular player and the club was promoted to J2 League from 1999. In 2000, he moved to J2 club Oita Trinita. Although he played many matches in 2000, he could hardly play in the match in 2001. In 2002, he moved to Japan Football League club Professor Miyazaki (later Sun Miyazaki). Although he played many matches, the club was relegated to Regional Leagues from 2003. He left the club end of 2004 season.

Coaching career
In 2014, when Shoji played for Regional Leagues club Dezzolla Shimane, he became a playing manager.

Club statistics

References

External links

1971 births
Living people
Association football people from Chiba Prefecture
Japanese footballers
Japan Soccer League players
J2 League players
Japan Football League (1992–1998) players
Japan Football League players
Kashiwa Reysol players
Montedio Yamagata players
Oita Trinita players
Estrela Miyazaki players
Japanese football managers
Association football midfielders